The football tournament at the 2021 Islamic Solidarity Games took place during 8-16 August 2021. Each participating nation's football association selected 23 players for the tournament.

Group A

Algeria
Head coach: Noureddine Ould Ali

Cameroon
Head coach: -
Yene Mbarga Arthur
Franklin Lincoln Banmassa
Karim Bello
Sack Bouget
Atangana Marc Dynam
Ismael Michel Nwoagou Fansu
Roche Foning
Ali Goni
Djonkep Harrison
Tchikeu Paul Henri
Pouakam Hubert
Junior Sunday Jang
Noah Tankeuh Yannick Joachim
Essomba Jordan
Iyendjock Joseph
Tchatou Boris Junior
Souaibou Marou
Abdoul Aziz Moubarak
Jean Eric Moursou
Fils Ndong
Wislow Hecube Ntone
Wassou Patient
Tsiolefack Ygor Rincesse
Ibrahim Saidou
Elimbi Samuel
Onana Severin
Fognig Sidoine
Ikpeme Stephan
Kevin William Temphoun
Moses Mayenment Yuh

Senegal
Head coach: -
Tendeng Etane Junior Aime
Ndiaye Amadou
Mane El Hadj Bacary
Faty Aliou Badara
Gueye Alioune Badara
Elhadji Balde
Assane Diatta
Abdoulaye Diedhiou
Ndour Raymond Dieme
Jean Louis Diouf
Alassane Faye
Sambou Bouly Junior
Camara Lamine
Badji Landing
Ndiaye El Hadji Latyr
Kante Alassane Maodo
Ndiaye Melo
Ndiaye Moussa
Ndiaye Cheikhou Omar
Sow Ousmane
Bassene Valere Paul
Abdou Seydi

Turkey
Head coach: -
Tuğbey Akgün
Metehan Altunbaş
Eren Aydın
İsmail Çokçalış
Mehmet Ataberk Dadakdeniz
Selim Dilli
Ahmet Gülay
Muhammed Gümüşkaya
Ali Eren İyican
Adem Eren Kabak
Cihan Kahraman
Eren Karadağ
Arda Kızıldag
Fatih Kurucuk
Mehmet Umut Nayir
Mehmet Özcan
Tayyip Talha Sanuç
Muhammet Taha Şahin
Batuhan Ahmet Şen
Polat Yaldır
Hakan Yeşil
Bertuğ Özgür Yıldırım
Canberk Yurdakul

Group B

Azerbaijan
Coach: Emin Imamaliev

The squad was announced on 1 August.

Iran
Head coach: -
Mohammadmahdi Ahmadi
Mohammadhosein Alipour Arallou
Belal Arazi
Seyedaria Barzegar
Mohammadhossein Eslami
Saman Fallahvarnami
Mohammad Ghorbani
Mohammadamin Hezbavi
Alireza Khodaei
Milad Kor
Amirmohammad Mohkamkarbadeleh
Amirhossein Nilpour
Payam Parsa
Ali Pilaram
Fardin Rabet
Mahdi Hashemnezhad Rahimabadi
Amirali Sadeghi
Sina Saeedifar
Yasin Salmani
Amir Jafari Seighalani
Amir Shahim
Erfan Shahriyarikhalaji
Arya Yousefi

Morocco
Coach: Hicham Dmiai

The squad was announced on 27 July.

* Over-aged player.

Saudi Arabia
Coach: Saad Al-Shehri

The squad was announced on 4 August. On 6 August, Ayman Yahya withdrew from the squad due to injury and was replaced by Mohammed Al-Rashidi.

References

2021
2021 Islamic Solidarity Games